The 2022 Leipzig Kings season in the European League of Football is the second season in the Leipzig Kings history.

Preseason
The franchise began late in the preseason with player signings. The first one was the signing of former Kings running backs coach David McCants and one day later European veteran A.J. Wentland. Leipzig starting quarterback Michael Birdsong announced on March 21, 2022 that he will retire from his professional football career. His replacement for the 2022 season is Jordan Barlow, who was the starting quarterback for the Southwestern Assemblies of God University and won the Victory Bowl in 2021 as well as being named the offensive MVP of the championship game. Like Birdsong previously, he signed a two-year-deal with the Kings.

Due to noise emissions in the Alfred-Kunze-Sportpark the team couldn't come to terms with the city for a new lease agreement. The franchise than announced the first home game in a different location with the Paul Greifzu Stadium.For the 2022 season the franchise announced that most of the home games will be held temporarily in the privately owned Bruno-Plache-Stadion of the 1. FC Lokomotive Leipzig.

Regular season

Standings

Schedule
 
Source: europeanleague.football

Roster

Transactions
From Hamburg Sea Devils:
 Jan-Phillip Bombek (February 17, 2022)
 Leon Kusterer (April 1, 2022)

From Panthers Wrocław:
 William James (March 30, 2022)

From Berlin Thunder:
 Pollys Junio Sacramento

From Barcelona Dragons:
 Myke Tavarres

Staff

Notes

References 

Leipzig Kings seasons
Leipzig Kings
Leipzig Kings